Church Lawford is a village and civil parish in Warwickshire. The population of the civil parish taken at the 2021 census was 432. 

The village lies north of the A428 main road, between Coventry and Rugby, and the Rugby to Coventry railway line. From the main road, the village is on a descending slope into the valley of the River Avon. On the opposite side of the Avon, which is crossed by an old stone bridge, is the hamlet of King's Newnham. The village is one of several Lawfords in the locality, along with Long Lawford and Little Lawford to the east and to the north, and Lawford Heath to the south-east, although they are completely separate settlements.

The village was mentioned in the Domesday Book of 1086 as Leileford. The village church of St Peter stands on high ground overlooking the Avon, and was first built in the 14th century. It was extensively rebuilt in the Victorian era, between 1873 and 1874.

The village once had a school, but this was closed in 1996. A reading room and village hall was built in 1912. But this was demolished in 2007 and replaced by a more modern building.

RAF Church Lawford

References

External links

Church Lawford Parish Council
Church Lawford entry on Our Warwickshire
Church Lawford official website
Church Lawford Village Hall

Villages in Warwickshire